Gaft may refer to:
Villages in  Razavi Khorasan Province, Iran
 Gaft, Joghatai
 Gaft, Sabzevar
Mohammadabad-e Gaft

Other
 Valentin Gaft (1935–2020), Russian actor